The Journal of Women, Politics & Policy is a peer-reviewed academic journal published by Routledge which covers women's roles in the political process. It was established in 1980 and changed from Women & Politics to its current name in 2005. The editor-in-chief is Heidi Hartmann (Institute for Women's Policy Research).

Abstracting and indexing 
The journal is abstracted and indexed in the Social Sciences Citation Index and Current Contents/Social & Behavioral Sciences. According to the Journal Citation Reports, the journal has a 2019 impact factor of 1.500, ranking it 15th out of 45 journals in the category "Women's Studies".

See also 
 List of women's studies journals

References

External links 
 

English-language journals
Feminist journals
Political science journals
Publications established in 1980
Quarterly journals
Routledge academic journals
Women's studies journals